Niederaltaich Abbey (Abtei or Kloster Niederaltaich) is a house of the Benedictine Order founded in 741, situated in the village of Niederalteich on the Danube in Bavaria.{{efn|"Niederaltaich" is the conventional spelling of the monastery, "Niederalteich" of the village.}}

Foundation and early history
After its foundation in 741 by Duke Odilo of Bavaria, the monastery, dedicated to Saint Maurice, was settled by monks from Reichenau Abbey under Saint Pirmin. Eberswind, the first abbot, is considered the compiler of the "Lex Baiuvariorum", the first code of law of the Bavarian people. 

The monastery brought great areas of Lower Bavaria into cultivation as far as the territory of the present Czech Republic, and founded 120 settlements in the Bavarian Forest. In the reigns of Charlemagne and Louis the German the abbey extended its possessions as far as the Wachau. Abbot Gozbald (825-855) was the latter's arch-chancellor.

In 848 the monastery received the right of free election of its abbots, and in 857 became reichsunmittelbar (that is, free of all territorial lordship except that of the monarchy itself). By the end of the 9th century over 50 monks had become abbots in other monasteries or been appointed bishops. The 10th century however brought the turmoil of the Hungarian incursions, and between 950 and 990 the abbey was a collegiate foundation (Kollegiatstift).

Under Abbot Gotthard or Godehard of Hildesheim (996–1022), better known as Saint Gotthard, the abbey entered a renewed golden age. Saint Gotthard, who along with Duke Henry of Bavaria, later Emperor Henry II, was a key supporter of contemporary monastic reform, was probably the abbey's best-known abbot. He later became Bishop of Hildesheim, where he was buried.

The abbey was granted by Emperor Frederick Barbarossa to the Bishop of Bamberg in 1152, and as a consequence lost its reichsunmittelbar status. In 1242 the Wittelsbachs inherited from the Counts of Bogen the office of Vogt (lord protector) of the abbey.

Important abbots from this time on were Hermann (in office from 1242 to 1273), the author of the "Annales Hermanni", and the Reformation abbots Kilian Weybeck (1503 to 1534) and Paulus Gmainer (1550 to 1585). Construction of the Gothic monastery church was begun in 1260 under Abbot Herman. Vitus Bacheneder, abbot between 1651 and 1666, created after the Thirty Years' War the foundations of the economic prosperity of the abbey in the Baroque period. Under Abbot Joscio Hamberger (1700–1739) the creation of the Baroque abbey and church took place, as well as the construction of the school. The church was the first commission for the later famous Baroque architect Johann Michael Fischer, who worked on it from 1724–1726.

Later history
The abbey was dissolved at the secularisation of Bavaria in 1803. A fire in the church in 1813, caused by a bolt of lightning, signalled the beginning of the demolition of the Baroque complex. The monastery buildings were sold off to private individuals. The side chapels of the abbey church, the Gothic cloisters and adjoining buildings, as well as the parish church, were demolished.

In 1918, with the help of a legacy from the theology professor Franz Xaver Knabenbauer, a native of Niederalteich, a monastery was re-established here and settled from Metten Abbey. In 1932 the monastery church received from the pope the title of "Basilica minor".

In 1949, under Abbot Emmanuel Maria Heufelder, the monastery became once again an independent abbey.

In 1946 the St.-Gotthard-Gymnasium ("St.-Gotthard-Grammar School") was refounded after having been closed by the Nazis. The remaining parts of the Baroque buildings were incorporated into new buildings in 1953–1954 and gradually renovated. In 1959 the Katholische Landvolkshochschule ("Catholic State Secondary School") was established here, and between 1971 and 1973 a new school building was erected for the St.-Gotthard-Gymnasium because the number of pupils had continually risen in the 1960s. Its boarding facilities, however, were shut down in 1994 and converted in 1999–2001 into the St. Pirmin Conference and Hospitality Centre. In 2006 and 2007 the school building of the St.-Gotthard-Gymnasium was refurbished. The school itself is now a Ganztagschule'', which provides obligatory lessons from 7.45 a.m. until 4.00 p.m..

Niederaltaich Abbey has been a member of the Bavarian Congregation of the Benedictine Confederation since its re-foundation in 1918.

Byzantine Catholicism
In 1924 Pope Pius XI gave the Benedictines the task of making the theology and spirituality of the east known in the west.

Niederaltaich, as a consequence of these ecumenical goals, has since been a monastery of two ecclesasiatical traditions or rites, one part of the monks living and praying according to the Roman rite, the other part according to the Byzantine rite.

The Eucharist and the Divine Office are celebrated by the monks in the German language in both rites, and in addition, liturgical texts from Church Slavonic and Greek have also been translated.

In 1986 a church and a chapel, both dedicated to Bishop Nicholas of Myra (Saint Nicholas), were set up for the celebration of the Byzantine rite in the buildings of the former monastery brewery.

See also
List of Carolingian monasteries
Carolingian architecture
Carolingian art

Notes

References

External links

 Kloster Niederaltaich
 Förderverein für die Byzantinische Kirche
 St.-Gotthard-Gymnasium
 Klöster in Bayern: Niederaltaich

Monasteries in Bavaria
Benedictine monasteries in Germany
Eastern Catholic monasteries in Europe
Carolingian architecture
Christian monasteries established in the 8th century
Basilica churches in Germany
Deggendorf (district)
Burial sites of the Luitpoldings